Customer lifecycle management or CLM is the measurement of multiple customer-related metrics, which, when analyzed for a period of time, indicate performance of a business. The overall scope of the CLM implementation process encompasses all domains or departments of an organization, which generally brings all sources of static and dynamic data, marketing processes, and value-added services to a unified decision supporting platform through iterative phases of customer acquisition, retention, cross- and upselling, and lapsed customer win-back.

Some detailed CLM models further break down these phases into acquisition, introduction to products, profiling of customers, growth of customer base, cultivation of loyalty among customers, and termination of customer relationship.

Any customer lifecycle management program would need to use a customer relationship management system (CRM). 

According to a DM Review magazine article by Claudia Imhoff, et al., "The purpose of the customer life cycle is to define and communicate the stages through which a customer progresses when considering, purchasing and using products, and the associated business processes a company uses to move the customer through the customer life cycle."

See also 

 Customer relationship management
 ECRM
 Purchase funnel

References

Lifecycle